The 1912 Wyoming Cowboys football team was an American football team that represented the University of Wyoming as a member of the Rocky Mountain Conference (RMC) during the 1912 college football season. In their first and only season under head coach Leon Exelby, the Cowboys compiled a 2–7 record (0–5 against conference opponents), finished last out of seven teams in the RMC, and outscored opponents by a total of 291 to 64.  For the second consecutive year, S. M. Fuller was the team captain.

Schedule

References

Wyoming
Wyoming Cowboys football seasons
Wyoming Cowboys football